Brychiopontiidae is a family of crustaceans belonging to the order Siphonostomatoida.

Genera:
 Brychiopontius Humes, 1974
 Neobrychiopontius Mahatma, Martínez Arbizu & Ivanenko, 2008
 Pseudobrychiopontius Avdeev, 2017

References

Siphonostomatoida